The following is a list of 2023 box office number-one films in Spain by week.

Films
This is a list of films which placed number one at the weekend box office for the year 2023 in Spain.

Highest-grossing films

In-year release

See also
 List of Spanish films — Spanish films by year
 List of Spanish films of 2023

References

External links

2023

Spain